Sankardev Academy, Nalbari is a Junior College (institute) in Assam, India.

External links
Wikimapia

Schools in Assam
Nalbari
Educational institutions in India with year of establishment missing